A list of animated television series first aired in 1979.

See also
 List of animated feature films of 1979
 List of Japanese animation television series of 1979

References

Television series
Animated series
1979
1979
1979-related lists